Prabhakaran is a 2008 Sri Lankan bilingual biographical war film directed by Thushara Peiris and produced by Osmond de Silva. It stars Priyankara Rathnayake, Anuruddhika Padukkage and Dasun Madhusanka in lead roles along with Darshan Dharmaraj and Sarath Dikkumbura. Music composed by Mahesh Denipitiya. It is the 1104th film in Sri Lankan cinema. The film gained notoriety after Peiris was attacked by a mob in Chennai, India during a visit to work on the film's Tamil version. The attack was a result of an opposition towards the film by Liberation Tigers of Tamil Eelam (LTTE) supporters in the midst of ongoing protests against the Sri Lankan Civil War.

The film screened successfully in Rome and 25 theaters around Europe and earned 18,000 Euros.

Plot
The film revolves around the life and incidents of an LTTE cadre and his brother in the Wanni.

Cast
 Priyankara Rathnayake as Piyasoma
 Anuruddhika Padukkage as Kamalini
 Dasun Madhusanka as Kamalini's brother
 Sarath Dikkumbura 
 Darshan Dharmaraj
 Chamila Gamage 
 Kumara Ranapura 
 Aishara Athukorala 
 Hashinika Karaliyadda 
 Kamal Siriwardana
 Harsha Udakanda

References

 Cinema database

2008 films
2000s Sinhala-language films
Films shot in Sri Lanka
Films about the Sri Lankan Civil War